Ejima is a Japanese surname. Notable people with the surname include:

, Japanese Paralympic swimmer
, Japanese pole vaulter

See also
Ejima Station, a railway station in Toyokawa, Aichi Prefecture, Japan

Japanese-language surnames